Manuel Sima Ntutumu Bindang (born 31 December 1988), simply Sima, is a footballer who plays as a striker.

Born in Gabon, he was a member, as a naturalized citizen, of the Equatorial Guinea national team.

Career
Sima played in Equatorial Guinea for Akonangui, Deportivo Mongomo and now went to Spain, where it's to trial in the Segunda División B club San Roque. He participated of a friendly match against the Segunda División side Recreativo de Huelva, won by 2–1.

International career
In June 2008, Sima represented Equatorial Guinea in the CEMAC Cup and scored a goal against Chad.

He was called by the Spanish Vicente Engonga -then coach of the Equatorial Guinea senior team- for the squad that played against South Africa on 11 October 2008, however he did not appear in the match. Sima eventually played in a friendly match against Mali on 25 March 2009.

International goals

References

External links
 
 
 
 Fútbol Estadísticas 

1988 births
Living people
Sportspeople from Libreville
Naturalized citizens of Equatorial Guinea
Equatoguinean footballers
Equatorial Guinea international footballers
Gabonese footballers
Akonangui FC players
CD La Muela players
Divisiones Regionales de Fútbol players
Expatriate footballers in Spain
Association football forwards
CD San Roque de Lepe footballers
Deportivo Mongomo players
21st-century Gabonese people